Roosta may refer to:
 Roosta, character of The Hitchhiker's Guide to the Galaxy
 Roosta, name of a district in Isfahan area in Iran
 Ali Asghar Modir Roosta, retired Iranian football striker and now coach

See also 

 Rosta (disambiguation)
 Rousta (disambiguation)
 Rusta (disambiguation)